Dustin Kirby (born December 12, 1984 in Mentor, Ohio) is an American association football defender who is known for playing for Real Salt Lake.

Youth

Born and raised in the suburbs of Cleveland, Kirby played on the Impact team of the Cleveland Soccer Academy from 1994 through 2003.  During that time he served as captain of the CSA Super Y team in 2002 and won a national championship in July 2003 as a member of the CSA Force Juniors of the U-19 Super Y League. As a member of the 2003 Ohio North State Team, he was named to the Region II pool.

Kirby graduated from Mentor High School in 2003 and was a 2003 NSCAA/Adidas Men's Soccer All-American. Kirby decided to attend Ohio State University in Columbus, Ohio. During his four years at Ohio State University he started every game but one (82 matches) during his career. Kirby was 1st-Team all Big Ten his senior year. He spent the 2004 collegiate offseason with the Cleveland Internationals in the USL Premier Development League.

Professional

When the 2007 MLS Superdraft came along, Kirby was not initially selected, but he was taken later on, in the 4th round of the supplemental draft, by Real Salt Lake.  In two seasons with the club, Kirby made two league appearances, as well as playing in an exhibition match against the national team of Fiji.  His debut came on October 15, 2007 in a 1-0 loss against the Houston Dynamo.

Kirby was released by Real Salt Lake on November 25, 2008.  He remains without a team as of March 2009.

External links

Ohio State Buckeyes profile
Profile at Cleveland Soccer Academy's IMPACT program

1984 births
Living people
People from Mentor, Ohio
Real Salt Lake players
Ohio State Buckeyes men's soccer players
Cleveland Internationals players
USL League Two players
Major League Soccer players
Real Salt Lake draft picks
Soccer players from Ohio
Association football defenders
American soccer players
Mentor High School alumni